Pasian di Prato is a comune (municipality) in the Province of Udine in the Italian region Friuli-Venezia Giulia, located about  northwest of Trieste and about  southwest of Udine.

Pasian di Prato borders the following municipalities: Basiliano, Campoformido, Martignacco, Tavagnacco and Udine (whose metropolitan area it belongs to).

References

External links
 Official website

Cities and towns in Friuli-Venezia Giulia